Great Pianists of the 20th Century - Alfred Brendel III is volume 14 of the Great Pianists of the 20th Century box set and is the third of three volumes dedicated to him. It features music by the composers Felix Mendelssohn, Carl Maria von Weber, Johannes Brahms, Frédéric Chopin, Franz Liszt, and Ferruccio Busoni. It was issued in CD format in 1999.

Critical reception
The album was selected as one of the highlights of the 200-CD series by Rob Cowan of the Gramophone. He was particularly pleased with the 1986 live recording of Brahms Piano Concerto No. 1 with Claudio Abbado and the Berlin Philharmonic, and described Brendel's rendition of Vallée d'Obermann as "one of the most inspired of his Liszt recordings."

It was also reviewed by Peter Burwasser in Fanfare. This critic was less pleased with the Brahms concerto recording, saying "this Brahms performance is a contrast of the straightforward, unsentimental, yet fully engaged and powerfully expressed playing of Brendel with the thick, bloated sound of the Berlin Philharmonic under Abbado." He much preferred Bernard Haitink's conducting in Liszt's Totentanz. He also notes that "Brendel's Chopin doesn't really work, although it is fascinating to hear what he makes of this music. This Chopin playing, even in one of the big polonaises, is too brusque and rhythmically unyielding, even as it is emotionally honest and bristling with energy."

Track listing
All tracks are reissues from Philips Classics Records unless otherwise noted.

See also
Alfred Brendel discography
Alfred Brendel – Unpublished Live and Radio Performances 1968–2001

References

External links
Alfred Brendel's official website. Accessed 20 November 2009.

1999 classical albums
1999 compilation albums